Willis Gaylord Clark Bagley (October 29, 1873 — October 20, 1943), also known as Willis G. C. Bagley and W. G. C. Bagley, was an American politician and banker who served as the 20th Treasurer of Iowa from 1939 to 1943.

Early life and education
Bagley was born in Magnolia, Wisconsin on October 29, 1873, one of six children to Shepherd Stephen Bagley and Louisa Cain. His father was a grocer who also owned a marble business. Bagley received his education in Mason City, Iowa, having moved there with his family when he was about four years old.

Career
After graduating from high school in 1891, Bagley became president of Iowa's First National Bank, elected in 1908.

Bagley achieved notoriety following a robbery perpetrated by the Dillinger Gang on March 13, 1934, during which the eponymous John Dillinger shot at Bagley and missed. The gang escaped with roughly $52,000.

A Republican, Bagley served as the 20th Treasurer of Iowa from 1939 until his death in office in 1943.

Bagley was succeeded by Republican John M. Grimes.

Personal life
Bagley was a member of the Freemasons, the Shriners, The Elks, and the Odd Fellows, as well as the American Bankers Association. Bagley's service in his community resulted in an inclusion in Who's Who in America.

On May 15, 1895, Bagley married Winifred Bogardus, with whom he had two children, Margaret and Burton. Both Bagley and his wife were members of the Methodist Episcopal Church; the former was also the church's treasurer.

Bagley died at the age of 69 in Des Moines, Iowa on October 20, 1943. He was interred at the Elmwood-St. Joseph Municipal Cemetery in Mason City. Bogardus, who died on May 11, 1967, was interred at the same cemetery.

References

External links
Willis Gaylord Clark Bailey at The Political Graveyard
Willis Gaylord Clark Bagley at Find a Grave

1873 births
1943 deaths
20th-century American politicians
20th-century Methodists
State treasurers of Iowa
Iowa Republicans
Methodists from Iowa
People from Des Moines, Iowa
People from Mason City, Iowa
People from Rock County, Wisconsin
Burials in Iowa